The North Moluccan pitta (Erythropitta rufiventris) is a species of the pitta. It was considered a subspecies of the red-bellied pitta.  It is endemic to Indonesia where it occurs on the northern Moluccas.  Its natural habitat is subtropical or tropical moist lowland forests.  It is threatened by habitat loss.

References

North Moluccan pitta
Birds of the Maluku Islands
North Moluccan pitta